OMVIC (Ontario Motor Vehicle Industry Council) is a council that regulates motor vehicle sales in Ontario that administers and enforces the Motor Vehicle Dealers Act on behalf of the Ontario Ministry of Government and Consumer Services (MGCS). OMVIC's mandate is to maintain a fair and an informed marketplace by protecting the rights of consumers, while enhancing the industry professionalism ensuring fair, honest and open competition for registered motor vehicle dealers.

History 
Prior to 1997, Ontario's motor vehicle dealer industry was regulated by the Ministry of Consumer and Commercial Relations (now the Ministry of Government and Consumer Services). OMVIC's creation on January 7, 1997, marked the first regulated business sector to move to self-management.

OMVIC's authority for day-to-day administration comes from the Safety & Consumer Statutes Administration Act. The Safety & Consumer Statutes Administration Act (Bill 54) was proclaimed on July 22, 1996. This Act, as provided for in Bill 54, created "Administrative Authorities" – Non-Profit Corporations independent of both industry associations and government – which deliver services and programs for different industries regulated by the ministry.

Controversy

In 2017, OMVIC announced the appointment of John Carmichael as Chief Executive Officer.   Mr. Carmichael was a longtime car dealer and an active member of the Conservative Party of Canada.   Mr. Carmichael previously served as a member of parliament for Don Valley West.   Mr. Carmichael was also appointed as Registrar.   In 2018, Ms. Maureen Harquail was appointed as OMVIC's Chief Operating Officer.  Ms. Harquail is a lawyer and an active member of the Conservative Party who unsuccessfully ran for election in 2008, 2011 and 2015 in the Willowdale, St Paul and Don Valley East Ridings respectively.   

In 2021, a value for money audit by the Auditor General of Ontario found OMVIC is “asleep at the wheel” when it came to meeting its mandate of protecting consumers. 

The report found that OMVIC had failed to act on about 50% of the time when consumers filed complaints against dealers between 2016 and 2020, leaving consumers to fend for themselves in civil court.

The report found OMVIC did not inspect 60% of dealers within its target of three years. In a five period, OMVIC simply closed inspection files in 77% of inspections where it was found that laws were broken instead of taking enforcement action.  

Former OMVIC board member Mohammed Bouchama told the Toronto Star that OMVIC “is going backwards” and said the board is putting dealers’ interests before consumers. 

Bouchama sat on OMVIC’s consumer advocacy committee for years, and recently spent two years on its board of directors until he was let go for “asking too many questions.”

Bouchama said a typical consumer complaint might involve a transmission that fails shortly after the used vehicle is purchased, and the dealer refuses to fix it under the warranty that was sold with the car. OMVIC is supposed to act on behalf of the car buyer, but frequently nothing is done.

“There’s no enforcement. Dealers are breaking the law every day,” Bouchama said. “The disciplinary committee met 35 times for 8,000 dealers last year. I could point to 200 transgressions online right now.”

In his comments to the media, he pointed to the composition of OMVIC’s board as the underlying problem. Nine of the 12 members are automobile dealers, while a tenth, Rod Jackson, is the son of a car dealer, Bouchama said. Another member is a political appointment by the Conservatives, while the Chair is a retired public servant.

“Nobody on the present board rightfully can be called pro-consumer,” he said. “They also got rid of staff who cared about consumer protection.”  

Even though OMVIC increased its annual consumer awareness spending by 60% over five years to nearly $2 million, 70% of Ontarians surveyed remained unaware of OMVIC and its role. 

Since 2015, OMVIC has doubled its vehicle transaction fee from $5 to $10. This fee is paid by the consumers on each vehicle they buy, and that is how OMVIC is funded. The audit found OMVIC used this money to shore up large budget surpluses instead of allocating it for consumer protection.

Meanwhile, OMVIC’s board members claimed over $523,000 in meal expenses from 2016-2020. Following one board meeting in October 2018, 11 board members and five OMVIC employees spent $2,700 on dinner at a Niagara winery at OMVIC’s expense. Nearly 40% of this bill was for alcohol. 

In August of 2022, OMVIC's Board announced Maureen Harquail's promotion to CEO and Registrar of OMVIC due to John Carmichael's retirement.

In January of 2023, the License Appeal Tribunal ordered the Registrar to carry out a proposal to revoke and refuse the registrations of Clifford Ernest Pilon, EasyWheels.ca Inc., Main Sreet Auto Importers Ltd O/A Gold Fleet Subaru and Main Street Auto Importers o/a EasyWheels.ca.   Mr. Pilon had served on OMVIC's board of directors since 2006.  The bulk of the allegations in the proposal were not contested.   These allegations were about a business manager (with whom Mr. Pilon acknowledged a personal relationship) having forged salesperson signatures on bills of sale at Goldfleet and Mr. Pilon providing false information on applications to renew registration for himself and the corporate appellents.  With respect to the forged signatures, the Tribunal found that--until he was replaced as the person in charge--"evidence indicates that the oversight provided by CEP (Pilon) as the person in charge fell far short of sufficient".   The Tribunal also found that the business manager was rehired by Pilon and Goldfleet in spite of conditions imposed by OMVIC that she not work for any dealership owned by Pilon.  The false information on renewal applications concerned convictions against Mr. Pilon for failing to comply with an Order under the Environmental Protection Act regarding an illegal waste disposal site.

With respect to Mr. Pilon's relection to OMVIC's board, the tribunal said

"MH (Maureen Harquail) took no particular issue with CEP (Pilon) running for relection to the Board primarily as she has no involvement with this process.   However, in light of his visible leadership position, she took additional precautions to ensure that the NOP (Notice of Proposal) was properly drafted.  As she explained, this accounted for its issuance after he was relected and should therefore not be viewed as inconsistent with the memberships earlier endorsement of CEP (Pilon) as a board member.   As well, as former chair of the Board of Directors (testifying on Pilon's behalf), Kevin Bavelaar (KB) explained, the eligiblity criteria for membership on the Board is substantially different from that of a registrant and presupposes a threshold of compliance with the ethical responsibilities of that role as set out in Section 6 of the Act"

The Tribunal found that neither Mr. Pilon nor his dealerships had ever been the subject of a consumer complaint to OMVIC or any disciplinary action prior to the issuance of the proposal.   However, the Tribunal also found Mr Pilon's lack of proper oversight and the false information on renewal applications provided grounds for the proposal to refuse and revoke to be carried out.

With respect to the refusals and revokations, Mr. Pilon was quoted in an article published by the North Bay Nugget on January 17, 2023 that the Tribunal decision has "21 errors in it and we plan to file an appeal".

Services 
As the regulator of motor vehicle sales in Ontario, OMVIC's mandate is to maintain a fair and informed marketplace by protecting the rights of consumers, enhancing industry professionalism and ensuring fair, honest and open competition for registered motor vehicle dealers.

This is achieved by:
 Maintaining strict dealer/salesperson registration requirements
 Inspecting all Ontario motor vehicle dealers (new and used)
 Providing free complaint-handling to consumers
 Developing/delivering consumer and dealer education/awareness programs
 Investigating and prosecuting industry non-compliance and illegal sales (curbsiding)

OMVIC’s Objectives
OMVIC is focused on achieving:
 Consumer protection through pursuit of those who would prey on an unwary public 
 Increased consumer confidence through compliance activities and complaint-handling
 Consumer awareness through dissemination of information concerning consumer rights (public information and awareness programs)
 Dealer professionalism through certification programs for new dealers and salespersons

Registration

Registration with OMVIC is mandatory for all automotive dealers (new or used) and salespeople in Ontario.

In order to become registered as a dealer or salesperson, each applicant is screened to ensure they meet the requirements of the Motor Vehicle Dealers Act (MVDA). OMVIC conducts a number of background checks on all applicants and each applicant is required to provide a Canada-wide criminal record search at the time of application. These processes help ensure registered dealers and salespeople will conduct themselves with honesty and integrity and in a financially responsible manner – all requirements of the MVDA.

The minimum fine for acting as an unregistered dealer (curbsider) is $2,500.

Education 
Registered dealers and salespeople who successfully pass the Certification Course through Georgian College's Automotive Business School of Canada and who then become registered with OMVIC are entitled to use the designation C.A.L.E. – Certified in Automotive Law and Ethics.

Using the C.A.L.E. designation builds trust, strengthens credibility and demonstrates to consumers that dealers and salespeople are proven professionals who have met Georgian College and OMVIC training standards.

Complaints and Inquiries 
OMVIC's Complaints and Inquiries Team handles inquiries and complaints from both consumers and dealers regarding the conduct of OMVIC-Registered Dealers.

Remember: These services are only available when consumers purchase from an OMVIC-Registered Dealer. OMVIC has no jurisdiction over private sales, manufacturers or independent repair facilities.

OMVIC cannot force or compel a dealer to give money back or offer compensation. OMVIC is not the court and only a court can impose a solution.

Enforcement

Inspections

Dealer inspections are conducted to ensure ongoing compliance with the MVDA.

OMVIC Inspectors are based regionally to provide an inspection program for the entire province.

If OMVIC receives a complaint from the public about a dealer, OMVIC's Complaints and Inquiries Team may attempt to resolve the issue over the telephone. Alternatively, an OMVIC Inspector may perform an inspection and discuss the complaint with the dealer.

Inspectors have the right to:
 Access and inspect the dealer's premises, vehicles, books and records. 
 Remove records to make photocopies.
 Make inquiries regarding any complaint about the dealer's conduct.
The dealer must assist the Inspector when asked, such as producing a document or record, or helping the Inspector use the dealer's own data storage, processing or retrieval device.

See also
 Ministry of Government and Consumer Services (Ontario)

References 

Consumer rights agencies
Organizations based in Ontario
Consumer organizations in Canada
Motor vehicle registration agencies
Self-regulatory organizations in Canada